Lankascincus gansi, also commonly known as Gans's lankaskink and Gans's tree skink, is a species of lizard in the family Scincidae. The species is endemic to the island of Sri Lanka.

Etymology
The specific name, gansi, is in honor of German-born American herpetologist Carl Gans (1923–2009).

Habitat

Geographic range
Localities in Sri Lanka from which L. gansi has been recorded include Gampola, Deniyaya, Akuressa, Ratnapura, Sinharaja, Kuruwita, and Pallegama.

Description
L. gansi has 23–28 scale rows at midbody. The lamellae under the fourth toe number 12–16. The dorsum is grayish brown, with brownish-black vertebral and flank stripes. The flanks are spotted with yellowish cream. The iris is yellowish brown in color. The venter is unpatterned grayish yellow. The throat of the male is dark.

Behavior
L. gansi hides under logs, stones, leaf litter, becoming active and coming out for foraging in morning and at dusk.

Diet
L. gansi preys on insects.

Reproduction
A sexually mature female of L. gansi may lay a clutch of one to two eggs in loose soil.

References

External links
http://animaldiversity.ummz.umich.edu/accounts/Lankascincus_gansi/classification/
Photos of Common Supple Skink

Further reading
Greer AE (1991). "Lankascincus, A New Genus of Scincid Lizards from Sri Lanka, with Descriptions of Three New Species". Journal of Herpetology 25 (1): 59–64. (Lankascincus gansi, new species).
Somaweera R, Somaweera N (2009). Lizards of Sri Lanka, A Colour Guide with Field Keys. Frankfurt am Main, Germany: Edition Chimaira / Serpents Tale. 304 pp. .

Lankascincus
Reptiles of Sri Lanka
Endemic fauna of Sri Lanka
Reptiles described in 1991
Taxa named by Allen Eddy Greer